Lubudi is a territory in the Lualaba Province  of the Democratic Republic of the Congo.

The territory holds the main factory of Ciments et materiaux de construction du Katanga (CIMENKAT).

References

Territories of Lualaba Province